The United States' Bethanie Mattek-Sands and Jack Sock defeated compatriots Venus Williams and Rajeev Ram in the final, 6–7(3–7), 6–1, [10–7] to win the gold medal in Mixed Doubles tennis at the 2016 Summer Olympics. In the bronze-medal match, the Czech Republic's Lucie Hradecká and Radek Štěpánek defeated India's Sania Mirza and Rohan Bopanna, 6–1, 7–5. The United States became the first nation to win two gold medals in the mixed doubles, and the Czech Republic won its first medal in the event.

The tournament was held at the Olympic Tennis Centre in the Barra Olympic Park in Barra da Tijuca in the west zone of Rio de Janeiro, Brazil from 10 to 14 August 2016. 30 players (15 pairs) from 12 nations competed (with one Spanish pair withdrawing).

Background

This was the sixth appearance of mixed doubles tennis. The event was first held in 1900 and would not be held again until 1912 (when both outdoor and indoor versions were held); it would then be held the next two Games in 1920 and 1924. Tennis was not a medal sport from 1928 to 1984, though there were demonstration events in 1968 (which included mixed doubles) and 1984 (which did not). Mixed doubles did not return with the rest of the tennis programme in 1988; instead, it was not until 2012 that mixed doubles returned to the programme, where it has been since.

Victoria Azarenka and Max Mirnyi were the defending champions, but they were not able to defend their title as a result of Azarenka's withdrawal due to pregnancy. There was no clear favourite.

Romania made its mixed doubles debut. France and Great Britain each competed for the fifth time, tied for most among nations.

Qualification

Entries for the 16-team mixed doubles event were determined on-site from those players already participating in singles or doubles, with a maximum of two teams per country. Teams had to be nominated by their National Olympic Committee by the deadline of 9 August.

Competition format

The competition was a single-elimination tournament with a bronze-medal match. All matches were best-of-three sets. Tie-breaks were used for the first two sets of each match. If the score was tied at one set all, a 'super tie-break' (the first pairing to win at least 10 points by a margin of two points) would be used.

Schedule

Seeds

Draw

Key

 INV = Tripartite invitation
 IP = ITF place
 Alt = Alternate
 PR = Protected ranking

 w/o = Walkover
 r = Retired
 d = Defaulted

Bracket

References

External links
 Olympic Tennis Event

Tennis at the 2016 Summer Olympics
2016
Mixed events at the 2016 Summer Olympics